Russell Ross (1929–1999) was an American professor of pathology, known for research on the pathogenesis of atherosclerosis.

Education and career
Russell Ross grew up in Jacksonville, Florida and graduated from Cornell University in 1951 before earning a degree in dentistry from Columbia University College of Dental Medicine in 1955. In 1958 he became a doctoral student and received a PhD in experimental pathology from the University of Washington at Seattle in 1962. At the University of Washington at Seattle, Dr. Ross joined the faculty of the University of Washington School of Medicine and was appointed Professor of Pathology in 1969. He served as chair of the Department of Pathology and helped to create an important center for research and medical training in vascular biology and pathology.

Ross was awarded a Guggenheim Fellowship for the academic year 1966–1967, which he spent studying cell culture at the Strangeways Research Laboratory. He received many awards and honors and was the author or co-author of 385 published papers and book chapters. Russ was a co-editor, with Valentín Fuster and Eric J. Topol, of the textbook Atherosclerosis and Coronary Artery Disease. He was elected a fellow of the American Academy of Arts and Sciences and a member of the Institute of Medicine of the National Academy of Sciences. He served a term as president of the American Society for Investigative Pathology and in 1992 received the Society's Rous-Whipple Award. He was a member of the editorial boards of more than 20 scientific journals.

Personal life
He participated in many community activities and was a member of the Planning Community of the Seattle Symphony. Upon his death he was survived by his wife, a son, and a daughter. His grandson was named after him.

See also
Chronic endothelial injury hypothesis

References

1929 births
1999 deaths
American pathologists
Cornell University alumni
Columbia University College of Dental Medicine alumni
University of Washington alumni
University of Washington faculty
People from St. Augustine, Florida
Fellows of the American Academy of Arts and Sciences
Members of the National Academy of Medicine